Renfrew Wharf railway station served the town of Renfrew, Renfrewshire, Scotland, from 1837 to 1967 on the Paisley and Renfrew Railway.

History 
The station opened as Renfrew on 3 April 1837 by the Paisley and Renfrew Railway. It closed on 1 February 1866 but reopened on 1 May 1866, the same day that  opened. This station's name was changed to Renfrew Wharf to avoid confusion between the two. To the south was the signal box and Meadowside Junction. Several sidings served different works, one being London Works, which had a siding that ran to Renfrew Ferry. The station closed on 5 June 1967.

References

External links 

Wharf RAILSCOT on Renfrew Wharf 

Disused railway stations in Renfrewshire
Railway stations in Great Britain opened in 1837
Railway stations in Great Britain closed in 1967
1837 establishments in Scotland
1967 disestablishments in Scotland